Cactopinus is a genus of typical bark beetles in the family Curculionidae. There are more than 20 described species in Cactopinus.

Species
These 22 species belong to the genus Cactopinus:

 Cactopinus agavensis Atkinson, 2010
 Cactopinus atkinsoni Wood, 1983a
 Cactopinus burjosi Wood, 1983a
 Cactopinus cactophthorus Wood, 1957d
 Cactopinus carinatus Wood, 1969a
 Cactopinus depressus Bright, 1967a
 Cactopinus desertus Bright, 1967
 Cactopinus granulatus Wood, 1983a
 Cactopinus granulifer Wood, 1969a
 Cactopinus hubbardi Schwarz, 1899
 Cactopinus koebelei Blackman, 1938
 Cactopinus mexicanus Wood, 1967d
 Cactopinus microcornis Wood, 1969a
 Cactopinus nasutus Wood, 1969a
 Cactopinus niger Wood, 1969a
 Cactopinus pini Blackman, 1938
 Cactopinus rhettbutleri Atkinson
 Cactopinus rhois Blackman, 1938
 Cactopinus setosus Wood, 1983a
 Cactopinus spinatus Wood, 1957d
 Cactopinus sulcifrons Atkinson, 2010
 Cactopinus woodi Atkinson, 2010

References

Further reading

 
 
 

Scolytinae
Articles created by Qbugbot